William Henry Beatty (February 18, 1838 – August 4, 1914) was the 15th Chief Justice of California from 1889–1914. Previously, he was chief justice of the Nevada Supreme Court from 1879–1880.

Early life and education
On February 18, 1838, Beatty was born in a small village of Monclova, Lucas County, Ohio (near Toledo) to H. O. Beatty and Margaret Boone Runyan. Around 1840, his family returned to Kentucky, where his parents were originally from. He attended public schools and in 1853, when he was 15 years old, his family moved to Sacramento, California and his father became a successful lawyer. When Beatty was 17 years old, he went East for his education and studied at the University of Virginia for two years, but did not receive a degree.

Legal and judicial career
Returning to Sacramento, Beatty read law at his father's office and in 1861 was admitted to the California bar. In 1863, he moved to Nevada and was elected City Attorney of Austin, Nevada, and then from 1864 to 1874 as District Judge in the Sixth, Seventh and then the Eighth Judicial Districts. At the same time, his father, Henry Oscar Beatty, moved to Nevada and in 1864 was elected a Justice of the Nevada Supreme Court. In November 1874, William Beatty was elected to the Nevada Supreme Court and took his seat in January 1875. He served for six years on the Supreme Court, the last two as chief justice. In January 1881, soon after the conclusion of his term, Beatty returned to Sacramento and resumed a private practice.

In 1888, both the Republican and Union Labor parties placed Beatty on the ticket for the position of Chief Justice of the Supreme Court of California. He won the election, defeating Niles Searls (who was appointed Chief Justice in April 1887 by Governor Washington Bartlett) to complete the unexpired portion of the term of the previous Chief Justice Robert F. Morrison, who had died. The next year, in 1890, the Republican Party renominated Beatty and he won the election in November for a 12 year term beginning January 8, 1891. In November 1902, Beatty was re-elected as Chief Justice under the Republican ticket to another 12 year term, which would expire in 1915. Beatty held the position of Chief Justice for over 25 years until he died in office on August 4, 1914, and Matt I. Sullivan assumed the post.

In 1904, Beatty supported an amendment to the California Constitution to create three divisions of a Court of Appeals to reduce the case load of the Supreme Court.

Honors and awards
On May 14, 1913, Beatty received an honorary degree of LL.D. from the University of California.

Personal information
On June 17, 1874, at Hamilton, White Pine County, Nevada, Beatty married Elizabeth May ("Bessie") Love (born 1845), who was originally from Salisbury, North Carolina, and they had two children: H. Oscar Beatty (c. 1876 – April 14, 1935) and Alice Margaret Beatty (Wright) (born 1880).

See also
 List of justices of the Supreme Court of Nevada
 List of justices of the Supreme Court of California
 Thomas Bard McFarland
 John D. Works
 Charles N. Fox
 John J. De Haven
 Charles H. Garoute
 Ralph C. Harrison
 William F. Fitzgerald

References

External links
 Memorial to William Henry Beatty. Nevada Supreme Court. 37 Nev. 514 (1914). Retrieved July 18, 2017.
 List of Nevada Supreme Court justices. Nevada State Courts Law Library.  Retrieved July 18, 2017.
 Memorial to William Henry Beatty. California Supreme Court. 168 Cal. Rpts. 799 (1915). Retrieved July 18, 2017.
 Photo of William H. Beatty taken in Sacramento when he was 35 or 36 years old: 
 

1838 births
1914 deaths
Chief Justices of California
Justices of the Nevada Supreme Court
19th-century American judges
19th-century American lawyers
Lawyers from San Francisco
People from Lucas County, Ohio
University of Virginia alumni
U.S. state supreme court judges admitted to the practice of law by reading law
California Republicans
California pioneers
Chief Justices of the Nevada Supreme Court